Symphony in B can refer to:

List of symphonies in B minor
List of symphonies in B flat major

See also
List of symphonies by key